Bretherdale Head is a hamlet in Cumbria, England. Meaning "Valley of the Brother", it was referred to as Britherdal in the 12th century.

References

Hamlets in Cumbria
Orton, Eden